Robert Low may refer to:

 Robert Low (writer) (1949–2021), Scottish journalist and writer of historical fiction
 Robert Low (Indian Army officer) (1838–1911), British officer in the British Indian Army
 Robert Cranston Low (1879–1949), Scottish physician and dermatologist

See also
 Robert Lowe (disambiguation)
 Robert Loe (born 1991), New Zealand basketball player